"On the Road" is a song written by Bob McDill, and recorded by American country music artist Lee Roy Parnell. It was released in August 1993 as the lead-off single and title track from his album of the same name.  It peaked at number 6 in the United States, and number 12 in Canada.

Content
The song consists of three vignettes featuring various characters (a neglected young wife, an underachieving teenager whose father has voiced his disappointment in him, and a retired couple whose children have forgotten them and never visit), who all flee their troubled or unfulfilling lives (in a Ford Fairlane, and "hot rod Chevy" and an Airstream trailer, respectively) and find adventure on the road.

Music video
The music video was directed by Michael Oblowitz.

Chart positions
"On the Road" debuted at number 67 on the U.S. Billboard Hot Country Singles & Tracks for the week of August 21, 1993.

References

1993 songs
Lee Roy Parnell songs
1993 singles
Songs written by Bob McDill
Song recordings produced by Scott Hendricks
Arista Nashville singles